Turda is a city in Cluj County, Transylvania, Romania.

The city consists of three neighborhoods: Turda Veche, Turda Nouă, and Oprișani. It is traversed from west to east by the Arieș River and north to south by its tributary, Valea Racilor.

History

Ancient times

There is evidence of human settlement in the area dating to the Middle Paleolithic, some 60,000 years ago. The Dacians established a town that Ptolemy in his Geography calls Patreuissa, which is probably a corruption of Patavissa or Potaissa, the latter being more common. It was conquered by the Romans, who kept the name Potaissa, between AD 101 and 106, during the rule of Trajan, together with parts of Decebal's Dacia.

The name Potaissa is first recorded on a Roman milliarium discovered in 1758 in the nearby Aiton commune.

Milliarium of Aiton is an ancient Roman milestone dating from 108 AD, shortly after the Roman conquest of Dacia, and showing the construction of the road from Potaissa to Napoca, by demand of the Emperor Trajan. This is the first epigraphical attestation of the settlements of Potaissa and Napoca in Roman Dacia.

The complete inscription is: "Imp(erator)/ Caesar Nerva/ Traianus Aug(ustus)/ Germ(anicus) Dacicus/ pontif(ex) maxim(us)/ (sic) pot(estate) XII co(n)s(ul) V/ imp(erator) VI p(ater) p(atriae) fecit/ per coh(ortem) I Fl(aviam) Vlp(iam)/ Hisp(anam) mil(liariam) c(ivium) R(omanorum) eq(uitatam)/ a Potaissa Napo/cam / m(ilia) p(assuum) X". It was recorded in the Corpus Inscriptionum Latinarum, vol.III, the 1627, Berlin, 1863.

This milliarium is an attestation of the road known to be built by Cohors I Hispanorum miliaria.

The castrum established was named Potaissa too and became a municipium, then a colonia. Potaissa was the basecamp of the Legio V Macedonica from 166 to 274.

The Potaissa salt mines were worked in the area since prehistoric times.

From the reign of Gordian III (238-244) numerous treasures were excavated from Turda, Țaga, Viișoara and Mărtinești, showing that in this time the defense was breaking under the Carps, Goths, Gepids and Vandals.

After the Aurelian retreat of 270, Potaissa became uninhabited and was destroyed in the first wave of migration to the territory. After conquering the place, the Huns settled down near. From this time three solidus were found from graves. Burying with coins was a Gepid tradition not typical of the Huns, meaning that they settled their vassals in Transylvania too.

Middle Ages

The territory changed hands between the Gepids and Langobards multiple times before both were expelled by the Avars.

After the Hungarian conquest, the kindred Kalocsa settled here. The first ispán was probably called Torda thus the origin of the name.

They were closed in 1932 but have recently been reopened for tourism.

Saxons settled in the area in the 12th century. Much of the town was destroyed during the Tatar invasion in 1241–1242, however most of its inhabitants survived by hiding in the cave system. King Stephen V ensured its quick revival by giving privileges.

On 8 January, 1288, Ladislaus IV attended the first national assembly in Torda and recruited an army of Transylvanians to repel the Cuman invasion. He pursued the Cumans back to the border. During this time the Hungarians were the absolute majority in the city. Numerous meetings were held here afterwards.

The Hungarian Diet was held here in 1467, by Matthias Corvinus. Later, in the 16th century, Turda was often the residence of the Transylvanian Diet, too. After the Battle of Mohács, the city became part of the Eastern Hungarian Kingdom and since 1570 the Principality of Transylvania. The 1558 Diet of Turda declared free practice of both the Catholic and Lutheran religions. In 1563 the Diet also accepted the Calvinist religion, and in 1568 it extended freedom to all religions, declaring that "It is not allowed to anybody to intimidate anybody with captivity or expelling for his religion" – a freedom unusual in medieval Europe. This Edict of Turda is the first attempt at legislating general religious freedom in Christian Europe (though its legal effectiveness was limited).

In 1609 Gabriel Báthori granted new privileges to Turda. These were confirmed later by Gabriel Bethlen. In the battle of Turda, Ahmed Pasha defeated George II Rákóczi in 1659.

Modern times
In 1711 the Grand Principality of Translyvania was formed which became in 1804 part of the Austrian Empire. In 1867, by the Austro-Hungarian Compromise, the city became again part of Hungary. After the First World War following the proclamation of the Union of Transylvania with Romania, Turda as well became part of Romania by the Treaty of Trianon. In 1944, the Battle of Turda took place here, between German and Hungarian forces on one side and Soviet and Romanian forces on the other. It was the largest battle fought in Transylvania during World War II.

From the late 1950s, Turda became a rather important industrial centre, housing factories for chemical, electrotechnical ceramics, cement, glass and steel cables. The nearby Câmpia Turzii town hosted a siderurgy (steel) plant. The city centre of Turda saw redevelopment in the late 1980s, including a House of Culture that hasn't been finished up to this date. Many houses in the historic center were demolished to create space for apartment buildings. The town's role of an industrial powerhouse has diminished from the 1990s onwards, but tourist attractions have kept the city in a good state up to today.

Climate
Turda has a continental climate, characterised by warm dry summers and cold winters. The climate is influenced by the city's proximity to the Apuseni Mountains, as well as by urbanisation. Some West-Atlantic influences are present during winter and autumn. Winter temperatures are often below 0 °C (32 °F), even though they rarely drop below −10 °C (14 °F). On average, snow covers the ground for 65 days each winter. In summer, the average temperature is approximately 18 °C (64 °F) (the average for July and August), despite the fact that temperatures sometimes reach 35 °C (95 °F) to 40 °C (104 °F) in mid-summer in the city centre. Although average precipitation and humidity during summer is low, there are infrequent yet heavy and often violent storms. During spring and autumn, temperatures vary between 13 °C (55 °F) to 18 °C (64 °F), and precipitation during this time tends to be higher than in summer, with more frequent yet milder periods of rain.

Demographics

According to the Hungarian census from year 1910, from 13,455 inhabitants 9,674 were Hungarians, 3,389 Romanians and 100 Germans.

According to the last Romanian census from 2011 there were 47,744 people living within the city.

Of this population, 84.7% are ethnic Romanians, while 8.98% are ethnic Hungarians, 6.03% ethnic Roma and 0.4% others.

Notable people
 Eta Boeriu
 Miklós Bogáthi Fazekas
 Andreea Cacovean 
 Horia Crișan
 Radu Crișan
 Emilian Dolha
 Veronica Drăgan
 Moise Dragoș
 Étienne Hajdú
 Miklós Jósika
 Baruch Kimmerling
 Ecaterina Orb-Lazăr
 Andrei Mureșan
 Ionuț Mureșan
 Camil Mureșanu
 Mona Muscă
 Cristina Pîrv
 Ion Rațiu
 Alin Rus
 Júlia Sigmond
 Ion Suru
 Rareș Takács
 István Timár-Geng
 Moise Vass
 Cosmin Vâtcă

Tourism
 Salina Turda
 Cheile Turzii

See also

 Decree of Turda
 Universitas Valachorum
 List of Transylvanian Saxon localities
 Ancient history of Transylvania, History of Transylvania
 Franziska Tesaurus
 Edict of Torda

International relations

Twin towns – sister cities
Turda is twinned with:
 Angoulême
 Hódmezővásárhely
 Santa Susanna
 Torda

Picture gallery

References

Bibliography

External links

 Official site of the city hall
 TurdaTurism.ro
 Fundatia Potaissa

 
Archaeological sites in Romania
Populated places in Cluj County
Localities in Transylvania
Cities in Romania
Roman sites in Romania
Roman towns and cities in Romania
Dacian towns
Mining communities in Romania
Capitals of former Romanian counties
Roman legionary fortresses in Romania